Ilawela (formerly variously transcribed as Geshtu-(E), Geshtu, Gestu, or We-ila) is, in Sumerian and Akkadian mythology, a minor god of intelligence. In the Atra-Hasis Epic he was sacrificed by the great gods and his blood was used in the creation of mankind:

See also
Kingu

References 

Michael Jordan, Encyclopedia of Gods, Kyle Cathie Limited, 2002

Mesopotamian gods
Killed deities